Beitaipingzhuang station is a subway station on Line 19 and Line 12 of the Beijing Subway. The station for Line 19 opened on 30 July 2022, and the station for Line 12 will open in 2023.

Platform Layout
The station has an underground island platform.

Exits
There are 2 exits, lettered A and B. Exit A is accessible as it provides lift access.

References

External links

Beijing Subway stations in Haidian District